Monachozela neoleuca is a moth of the Heliozelidae family, and the only species in the genus Monachozela. It was described by Edward Meyrick in 1931. It is found in Brazil.

References

Moths described in 1931
Heliozelidae
Moths of South America